Lim Jock Hoi is a Bruneian government official who served as the 14th secretary-general of ASEAN between 2018 and 2022.  He previously served as the permanent secretary of the Ministry of Foreign Affairs and Trade, Brunei.

References

Living people
Place of birth missing (living people)
Bruneian government officials
Bruneian people of Chinese descent
Secretaries-General of ASEAN
1951 births